The Agreement concerning the Manufacture of, Internal Trade in and Use of Prepared Opium, also known as the Agreement concerning the Suppression of the Manufacture of, Internal Trade in, and Use of, Prepared Opium, was a treaty promulgated in Geneva on 11 February 1925. The treaty was ratified by the British Empire, the British Raj, France, Japan, the Netherlands, Portugal, and Siam.

The Agreement stated that the signatory nations were "fully determined to bring about the gradual and effective suppression of the manufacture of, internal trade in and use of prepared opium".  Article I required that, with the exception of retail sale, the importation, sale and distribution of opium be a monopoly of government, which would have the exclusive right to import, sell, or distribute opium.  Leasing, according, or delegating this right was specifically prohibited.  Article II prohibited sale of opium to minors, and Article III prohibited minors from entering smoking divans.  Article IV required governments to limit the number of opium retail shops and smoking divans as much as possible.  Articles V and VI regulated the export and transport of opium and dross.  Article VII required governments to discourage the use of opium through instruction in schools, literature, and other methods.

The Agreement was superseded by the 1961 Single Convention on Narcotic Drugs.

References
Agreement concerning the Suppression of the Manufacture of, Internal Trade in, and Use of, Prepared Opium, United Nations Treaty Collection.
Ratifications.
The Evolution of the International Control of Narcotic Drugs, Bulletin on Narcotics, 1950.

Drug control treaties
Treaties concluded in 1925
Treaties entered into force in 1926
Opium
Treaties of the French protectorate of Cambodia
Treaties of the French Fourth Republic
Treaties extended to British India
Treaties of Japan
Treaties of the Kingdom of Laos
Treaties of the Netherlands
Treaties of Thailand
Treaties of the United Kingdom
League of Nations treaties
Treaties of the State of Vietnam
1925 in Switzerland